Tema City FC, commonly referred to as Tema City, is a Ghanaian football club based in Tema, Greater Accra. They compete in the Division Two League in Ghana.

History 
The club was founded in July 2017 by businessman and politician Hon. Eric Jerry Aidoo who is the Greater Accra Regional Youth Organiser of the Convention People's Party.  In April 2019 the club won its first trophy by lifting the 2019 Palace Trophy after beating Future Heroes FC 3 - 0 at the Complex Sports Arena in Tema on Saturday. The club has also won the Bobo Djaló Tournament Cup and the Next Africa Big Talent. Tema City play their home games at the Tema Park.

Current squad

Players and transfer 
In May 2019 Tema City FC midfielder Benjamin Mireku was rated among the Top 10 Ghanaian U20 footballing prospects you must know. In August 2019 Ghanaian media reports linked defender Kelvin Boateng Yeboah to a move to Portuguese side Rio Ave. In February 2019 the club announced the signing of Malian player Mamadou Diallo. Trio Salim Uzair Baafada, Kwesi Ankomah, and goalkeeper Philip Folivi have been linked with moves to Ghana Premier League side AshantiGold S.C. in the past.

Honours 

 Palace Trophy - 2019
 Bobo Djaló Tournament Cup -2018
 Next Africa Big Talent - 2020

References 

Football clubs in Ghana
Sports clubs in Ghana